The Yichang–Wanzhou railway, or the Yiwan railway connects the cities of Yichang (Hubei Province) and Wanzhou (Chongqing Municipality) via Lichuan, Hubei. It was completed in 2010 and forms part of the Shanghai–Wuhan–Chengdu passenger railway. Out of the line's total  length,  runs on bridges or in tunnels. According to the chief engineer, Zhang Mei, the line was the most difficult ever constructed in China. Operation started on  2010.

Connections

At its eastern end, the Yichang East railway station, the Yiwan Railway connects with the high-speed Wuhan–Yichang railway to Hankou (Wuhan).

At Liangwu railway station, the Yichang–Wanzhou railway connects with the high-speed Chongqing–Lichuan railway (Yuli), the main route of the Huhanrong corridor, which provides the most direct connection to Chongqing and on to Chengdu. From Liangwu, the Yichang–Wanzhou railway heads north to reach Wanzhou. With the Yuli and Hanyi lines both in operation and in use by high-speed, it will become possible to  travel by train between Wuhan and Chongqing in around 5 hours, compared to the 22 hours before the opening of the Yiwan Line. However, the opening of high-speed service (as opposed to "regular" trains) on the Yichang–Wanzhou railway was delayed until July 1, 2014.

Until the Yuli line was completed at the end of 2013, all through traffic on the Yiwan Railway had to go along its entire length, to the line's western terminus at Wanzhou, and then over  an existing railway branch to Dazhou, Sichuan. From Dazhou, trains could continue both southwest toward Chongqing on the Xiangyang–Chongqing railway and west toward Chengdu on the Dazhou–Chengdu Railway.

Layout
The region has numerous mountains and is sometimes referred to as "the eastern edge" of the Yunnan-Guizhou Plateau. Until recently, the region had no railways, and hardly any paved roads (beyond China National Highway 318, which the new railway more or less parallels). The new (G42 Hurong Expressway) was built along the same corridor as well (see Si Du River Bridge for an example of engineering that was required).

Owing to the difficult terrain, the project involved a large number of bridges (including two over the Yangtze River: the Wanzhou Railway Bridge and the Yichang Railway Bridge) and tunnels. Out of the line's total  length,  runs on bridges or in tunnels. This made the line the most difficult and the most expensive (per kilometre) of all China's railways up to that time. At a cost of U.S.  per kilometre, the per-kilometre construction costs were twice as high as those for the Qinghai–Tibet Railway which cost U.S.  per kilometre.

Construction history

The railway was first proposed by Sun Yat-sen in 1903, but construction was not started until 2003 due to the difficulties of the project. According to the chief engineer, Zhang Mei, the line was the most difficult ever constructed in China.

As of mid-2009, the embankments, bridges, and tunnels along the Yiwan Railway had been mostly completed, and about half the rails had been laid. On  2010, the line's construction was completed.

Trial operations started on 19 November, and regular operation started on  2010, with passenger trains from Wuhan running to Lichuan; on  2011 a through-passenger service started from Wuhan to Chongqing over the entire Yiwan line.

See also

 List of railway lines in China

References

External links
 Yichang–Wanzhou railway Project, People's Republic of China (2003), at Asian Development Bank site. Discusses both technical and social issues.

Railway lines in China
Rail transport in Hubei
Rail transport in Chongqing
Railway lines opened in 2010
2010 establishments in China